13–15 Cathedral Street is an historic building in Dunkeld, Perth and Kinross, Scotland. It is two storeys, with a four-window frontage.

Per a plaque on its façade, the building won the Saltire Society Award for Reconstruction in 1958.

See also 
 List of listed buildings in Dunkeld And Dowally, Perth and Kinross

References 

Cathedral Street 13–15
Category B listed buildings in Perth and Kinross
1715 establishments in Scotland